Harvard University is a university in Cambridge, Massachusetts, USA.

Harvard may also refer to:

People 
 Harvard (name), a given name and surname, including list of people with this name

Boston area 
Harvard Book Store, an independent bookstore in Harvard Square
Harvard Bridge, a bridge over the Charles River near the Massachusetts Institute of Technology
Harvard Club of Boston, a private social club founded by Harvard alumni
Harvard College, the undergraduate division of Harvard University
Harvard Crimson, Harvard University's athletic program
The Harvard Crimson, Harvard University's daily student newspaper
Harvard Square, a plaza in Cambridge, Massachusetts, adjacent to the Harvard University campus
Harvard Yard, the center of the Harvard campus, adjacent to Harvard Square
Harvard (MBTA station), the subway station located in Harvard Square

Cities 
Harvard, Idaho
Harvard, Illinois, a city in the United States
Harvard, Massachusetts, a town in the United States
Harvard, Nebraska, a city in the United States
Harvard Township, Clay County, Nebraska, a township in the United States

Aeroplanes 
Harvard (aeroplane), often used name for the North American T-6.
Harvard Blue Yonder EZ (aeroplane), a replica of the Harvard.

Ships 
List of ships named Harvard
USS Harvard, several ships of the United States Navy

Other 
 Harvard architecture, a type of computer architecture.
 Harvard (automobile), a Brass Era car built in New York between 1915 and 1921.
 Harvard Graphics, an early breaking computer software for handling diagrams.
 Harvard Mark I, an early digital computer.
 Harvard referencing, a citation style also known as the "author-date method".
 Harvard station (disambiguation), stations of the name.
 Harvard-Westlake School, a prep school in Los Angeles.
 Harvard 736 (planet), a minor planet orbiting the Sun.
 Fender Harvard, a guitar amplifier.
 Harvard Islands, an island group in northwestern Greenland.